The Kerry Park Islanders are a Junior "B" ice hockey team based in Mill Bay, British Columbia, Canada. They are members of the South Division of the Vancouver Island Junior Hockey League (VIJHL). The Islanders play their home games at Kerry Park Recreation Center. They are  coached 
by  Brian Passmore

History

The Islanders joined the then called 'South Vancouver Island Junior B League' in 1976. In its VIJHL history, the team has won the Brent Patterson Memorial Trophy seven times, in 1982, 1986, 1990, 1991, 1993, 1994 and 2006. The Islanders have won the Andy Hebenton Trophy eight times, as the team with the league's best regular season record in 1980, 1982, 1985, 1986, 1990, 1999, 2005 and 2006.

Season-by-season record

Note: GP = Games played, W = Wins, L = Losses, T = Ties, OTL = Overtime Losses, Pts = Points, GF = Goals for, GA = Goals against

NHL alumni
Matt Ellison

Awards and trophies

Brent Patterson Memorial Trophy
1981-82, 1985–86, 1989–90, 1990–91, 1992–93, 1993–94, 2005–06

Andy Hebenton Trophy
1979-80, 1981–82, 1984–85, 1985–86, 1989–90, 1998–99, 2004–05, 2005–06

Grant Peart Memorial Trophy
1981-82, 1982–83, 1983–84, 1985–86, 1987–88, 1996–97, 1999-00, 2002–03

Doug Morton Trophy
Mark Johnson 1981-82
Mark Johnson 1982-83
Bob Court: 1985-86
Brent Scyrup: 1995-96

Jack Kingston Memorial Trophy
Trevor Greco: 2006-07

Jamie Robertson Trophy
Dave Bodger: 1982-83
Bob Court: 1984-85
John Rankin: 1986-87
Keegan Young: 2004-05

Larry Lamoureaux Trophy
Matt Ellison: 1997-98

Ray's Sports Centre Trophy
Jim Lekitschnig: 1979-80
Peter Hall: 1984-85
Peter Hall: 1985-86
1998-99
Riley Blinco: 2004-05
Kiefer Smiley-Didier: 2005-06

Walt McWilliams Memorial Trophy
Clint Whittaker: 1989-90
Joe Life: 1990-91
Chad Erickson: 1992-93
Greg Strom: 1993-94
Dan Whiteford: 1996-97
Neil Doherty: 2005-06
Colin Fernandes: 2007-08

External links
Official website of the Kerry Park Islanders

Ice hockey teams in British Columbia
1970 establishments in British Columbia
Ice hockey clubs established in 1970